The 126th New York State Legislature, consisting of the New York State Senate and the New York State Assembly, met from January 7 to April 23, 1903, during the third year of Benjamin B. Odell, Jr.'s governorship, in Albany.

Background
Under the provisions of the New York Constitution of 1894, 50 Senators and 150 assemblymen were elected in single-seat districts; senators for a two-year term, assemblymen for a one-year term. The senatorial districts were made up of entire counties, except New York County (twelve districts), Kings County (seven districts), Erie County (three districts) and Monroe County (two districts). The Assembly districts were made up of contiguous area, all within the same county, .

At this time there were two major political parties: the Republican Party and the Democratic Party. The Social Democratic Party, the Prohibition Party, the Socialist Labor Party, and a "Liberal Democratic" faction also nominated tickets.

Elections
The New York state election, 1902, was held on November 4. Gov. Benjamin B. Odell, Jr. was re-elected; and State Senator Frank W. Higgins was elected Lieutenant Governor; both Republicans. Of the other six statewide elective offices up for election, four were carried by the Republicans and two by the Democrats. The approximate party strength at this election, as expressed by the vote for Governor, was: Republicans 665,000; Democrats 656,000; Social Democrats 23,000; Prohibition 20,000; Socialist Labor 16,000; and Liberal Democrats 2,000.

Sessions
The Legislature met for the regular session at the State Capitol in Albany on January 7, 1903; and adjourned on April 23.

S. Frederick Nixon (R) was re-elected Speaker.

John Raines (R) was elected president pro tempore of the State Senate with 25 votes for and 24 against him. Republican senators Edgar T. Brackett, Walter L. Brown and Nathaniel A. Elsberg voted against Raines.

On January 20, the Legislature re-elected Thomas C. Platt (R) to a second term as U.S. Senator from New York, for a six-year term beginning on March 4, 1903.

State Senate

Districts

Note: In 1897, New York County (the boroughs of Manhattan and Bronx), Kings County (the borough of Brooklyn), Richmond County (the borough of Staten Island) and the Western part of Queens County (the borough of Queens) were consolidated into the present-day City of New York. The Eastern part of Queens County (the non-consolidated part) was separated in 1899 as Nassau County. Parts of the 1st and 2nd Assembly districts of Westchester County were annexed by New York City in 1895, and became part of the Borough of the Bronx in 1898.

Members
The asterisk (*) denotes members of the previous Legislature who continued in office as members of this Legislature. Luke A. Keenan, Jotham P. Allds and Albert T. Fancher changed from the Assembly to the Senate.

Note: For brevity, the chairmanships omit the words "...the Committee on (the)..."

Employees
 Clerk: James S. Whipple
 Sergeant-at-Arms: Charles R. Hotaling
 Assistant Sergeant-at-Arms: William W. Adams
 Doorkeeper: John E. Gorss
 Assistant Doorkeeper: Charles H. Bernard
 Stenographer: A. B. Sackett
 Assistant Clerk: Lafayette B. Gleason
 Journal Clerk: Ernest A. Fay
 Index Clerk: A. Miner Wellman

State Assembly

Assemblymen

Note: For brevity, the chairmanships omit the words "...the Committee on (the)..."

Employees
 Clerk: Archie E. Baxter
 Sergeant-at-Arms: Frank W. Johnston
 Doorkeeper: Benjamin J. Sanger
 First Assistant Doorkeeper: Andrew Kehn
 Second Assistant Doorkeeper: Daniel Cameron Easton
 Stenographer: Henry C. Lammert
 Assistant Clerk: Ray B. Smith

Notes

Sources
 Official New York from Cleveland to Hughes by Charles Elliott Fitch (Hurd Publishing Co., New York and Buffalo, 1911, Vol. IV; see pg. 346ff for assemblymen; and 365 for senators)
 The New York Red Book by Edgar L. Murlin (1903; see pg. 63–103 for senators' bios; between pg. 64 and 65 for senators' portraits; pg. 104–192 for assemblymen's bios; between pg. 128 and 129 for assemblymen's portraits; pg. 326 for senators; and pg. 451 for assemblymen)
 REPUBLICANS HOLD THE LEGISLATURE in NYT on November 5, 1902
 S. FRED NIXON FOR SPEAKER in NYT on January 7, 1903
 NEW YORK LEGISLATURE in NYT on January 8, 1903

126
1903 in New York (state)
1903 U.S. legislative sessions